Köln (F220) is the lead ship of the s of the German Navy.

Design 

The Type 120 or Köln-class frigates were built as smooth-deckers and had very elegant lines. The very diagonally cut bow and the knuckle ribs in the foredeck made it easy to navigate. The hull and parts of the superstructure were made of shipbuilding steel, other superstructure parts were made of aluminum. Due to the installation of gas turbines, large side air inlets were necessary, which could be closed by lamellas. The stern was designed as a round stern. The large funnel was sloped and skirted. Behind the bridge superstructure stood the tall lattice mast with radar and other antennas. The hull was divided into 13 watertight compartments. 

On the forecastle was a 10 cm gun, behind it, set higher, a 4 cm twin gun. Behind it stood two quadruple anti-submarine missile launchers 37.5 cm from Bofors. A 4 cm Bofors single gun on each side of the aft superstructure and another 4 cm double mount at the end of the superstructure. There was a second 10 cm gun on the quarterdeck. In addition, there were two 53.3 cm torpedo tubes behind the front superstructures. They were used to fire Mk-44 torpedoes. Mine rails were laid behind the torpedo tubes and ran to the stern.

Construction and career 
Köln was laid down on 21 December 1957 and launched on 6 December 1958 in Stülcken & Sohn, Germany. She was commissioned on 15 April 1961.

After 21 years of service, she was decommissioned on 17 December 1982 in Wilhelmshaven, where it was initially used for spare parts.

Since 15 November 1989, she has been used as a training hulk at the Naval Damage Control Training Centre (EAZS) in Neustadt. There, crews of the maritime units are trained in fire fighting and leak prevention.

Gallery

Notes

References 

Gardiner, Robert and Stephen Chumbley. Conway's All The World's Fighting Ships 1947–1995. Annapolis, Maryland, USA: Naval Institute Press, 1995. .
Prézelin, Bernard and A.D. Baker III. The Naval Institute Guide to Combat Fleets of the World 1990/1991. Annapolis, Maryland, USA: Naval Institute Press, 1990. .

Köln-class frigates
1958 ships
Ships built in Hamburg